"The One I Gave My Heart To" is a song recorded by American singer Aaliyah for her second studio album One in a Million (1996). The song was written by Diane Warren and was produced by Daryl Simmons. Musically, it is a pop and R&B power ballad with Aaliyah utilizing her soprano tone. Lyrically, the song is about the protagonist asking how the person that she loved could break her heart. The song was released as the fifth and final single from One in a Million with "Hot Like Fire" on September 16, 1997 by Blackground Records and Atlantic Records.

Upon its release, "The One I Gave My Heart To" was met with generally positive reviews from critics, with many praising Aaliyah's vocal delivery and tone on the record. Commercially, "The One I Gave My Heart To" performed well, peaking at number nine on the US Billboard Hot 100 and at number eight on the Hot R&B/Hip-Hop Songs. It has also been certified gold by the Recording Industry Association of America (RIAA), selling over 900,000 copies in the United States.

Writing and production
The song came into fruition when songwriter Diane Warren expressed interest in working with Aaliyah, with Warren later saying: "I remember really liking Aaliyah and wanting to work with her." Eventually, Warren reached out to Atlantic Records chairman Craig Kallman to express her wish of working with Aaliyah and Kallman agreed to the collaboration.
Her goal in working with Aaliyah was to have her do a certain song that she would not have normally done to showcase a different side of her, which included displaying her vocal range in a different way than what she was used to doing. Once Warren was on board, producer Babyface was chosen to produce the song. Due to unforeseen circumstances, however, he was unable to complete the work, so he enlisted producer Daryl Simmons to replace him instead.
Simmons would go on to produce the album version of the song, while pop producer Guy Roche would go on to produce the single version.

Music and lyrics
Written by Diane Warren, "The One I Gave My Heart To" is a Pop, and R&B power ballad. The song is composed in the key of G major, and follows the verse-chorus form with Aaliyah doing improvisations at the ad-libbed last verse, marking the climax of the song. Lyrically, Aaliyah is "highlighting a broken heart and sense of betrayal". The song marks arguably Aaliyah's most powerful vocal performance, in which she showcased her belting range as she usually used her falsetto and lower register in most of her compositions. Warren spoke highly of Aaliyah's vocal performance, stating that "She could go where the Whitneys went. She wailed on that single I wrote for her. I write songs that challenge singers, and she rose to the occasion."

Critical reception
In his review of "The One I Gave My Heart To", Larry Flick from Billboard felt that the song was a strong top-40 contender and that it would "rise to the top" on a variety of radio formats. He also praised both Aaliyah's vocal styling and the overall production of the song, saying: "She brings an engaging, youthful romance to a sweet Diane Warren composition which is fleshed out with a careful balance of straight ahead pop and R&B sensibilities in producer Guy Roche's instrumental arrangement".
 According to Edwin Ortiz from Complex, Aaliyah proved that she could "switch from her usual mid-tempo style and deliver an incredible vocal performance". He also felt that she "brought the song to life through her smooth soprano vocals, highlighting a broken heart and sense of betrayal, with the accompanying video perfectly depicting her emotional state". Georgette Cline from The Boombox felt that Aaliyah allowed her "vulnerability to be exposed" on the song. Ed Masley from AZCentral, felt "The production goes a bit too heavy on the schmaltz but the vocals are emotional enough to rise above it".

Commercial performance 
In the United States, "The One I Gave My Heart To" debuted on the Billboard Hot 100 issued October 4, 1997 at number 24. It reached its peak at number nine in its seventh week, making it the highest-charting single from One in a Million. The song debuted at number 18 on the Hot R&B/Hip-Hop Songs on October 4, reaching the top ten at number eight on December 6. The song also peaked within the top ten on the Rhythmic chart, at number eight, on November 15. On the Dance Club Songs, the song peaked at number 18 on February 28, 1998. "The One I Gave My Heart To" was certified gold by the Recording Industry Association of America (RIAA) for shipments of 500,000 units, on October 21, 1997. By the end of 1997, the single had sold over 900,000 copies in the US.

Internationally, the song was a moderate success, peaking at number 30 on the UK Singles Chart on November 23, 1997. In the United Kingdom, the song also peaked at number 25 on the dance chart, and at number three on the R&B chart. Elsewhere in Europe, "The One I Gave My Heart To" peaked at number 16 on the Dutch Tipparade chart on February 6, 1998. In New Zealand, the song peaked at number 28 on December 7, 1997.

Music video
The accompanying music video for "The One I Gave My Heart To" was directed by Darren Grant, and uses the single version of the song, keeping the second half of the first verse, which was normally cut for radio airplay. Throughout the video, there are two main settings and another one at the end. In one setting, Aaliyah is inside a house with wooden floors and walls. In the house, there is a room with nothing but a mirror on the floor. With this mirror, Aaliyah is able to see other scenes of the video. The second shows Aaliyah sitting on wooden bench in a forest setting. In the final scene, Aaliyah performs outside during a rain shower.

The music video for "The One I Gave My Heart To" made its television debut on MTV during the week of September 14, 1997. During the week of September 28, the video made its debut on BET. The video became the 22nd most-played video on MTV during the week of November 2, 1997. Meanwhile, it became the 19th most-played video on BET during the week of December 14, 1997.

Live performances
On October 6, 1997 Aaliyah performed "The One I Gave My Heart To", on The Keenen Ivory Wayans Show. Thirteen days later, she performed "The One I Gave My Heart To" at Nickelodeon's fourth annual The Big Help event in Santa Monica, California. On November 26, 1997 she performed "The One I Gave My Heart To" on the BET show Planet Groove. On December 10, Aaliyah performed "The One I Gave My Heart To" at the UNICEF Gift of Song benefit gala, which aired live on TNT. In 1998, Aaliyah co-headlined the B-96 B-Bash, hosted by Chicago radio station B96; during the event, she performed "The One I Gave My Heart To".

Track listings and formats

US and UK maxi CD single and US 12-inch vinyl
"The One I Gave My Heart To" (radio mix) – 3:54   
"Hot Like Fire" (album version) – 4:23
"Hot Like Fire" (Timbaland's Groove mix) (featuring Timbaland) – 4:35 
"Hot Like Fire" (Feel My Horns mix) – 4:37   
"Hot Like Fire" (instrumental) – 4:22     
"Death of a Playa" (featuring Rashad Haughton) – 4:53

US cassette and CD singles
"The One I Gave My Heart To" (radio mix) – 3:53
"Hot Like Fire" (album version) – 4:23

"The One I Gave My Heart To"/"One in a Million"
"The One I Gave My Heart To" (Soul Solution club mix)
"The One I Gave My Heart To" (Soul Solution dub)
"One in a Million" (Nitebreed Mongolidic mix) 
"One in a Million" (Geoffrey's House mix)
"One in a Million" (Armand's Drum n' Bass mix) 
"One in a Million" (Wolf-D Big Bass mix) 
"One in a Million" (Nitebreed dub)

Charts

Weekly charts

Year-end charts

Certifications and sales

|}

Release history

Notes

References

External links
 

1996 songs
1997 singles
Aaliyah songs
Music videos directed by Darren Grant
Songs written by Diane Warren
Pop ballads
Contemporary R&B ballads
Blackground Records singles
Songs about heartache
1990s ballads